The 1992 NCAA Division I Women's Tennis Championships were the 11th annual championships to determine the national champions of NCAA Division I women's singles, doubles, and team collegiate tennis in the United States. They were hosted by Stanford University at the Stanford Tennis Stadium in Stanford, California between May 13–17, 1992. 

Florida defeated Texas, score 5–3, in the championship match, the Gators' first team national title. Florida, in turn, completed a sweep of all three national championships in women's tennis.

Team tournament
Site: Stanford Tennis Stadium, Stanford, California

See also
1992 NCAA Division I Men's Tennis Championships – men's and women's tournaments not held at same site until 2006
NCAA Division II Tennis Championships (Men, Women)
NCAA Division III Tennis Championships (Men, Women)

References

External links
List of NCAA Women's Tennis Champions

NCAA Division I tennis championships
NCAA Division I Women's Tennis Championships
NCAA Division I Women's Tennis Championships
NCAA Division I Women's Tennis Championships